Rose Mary Prosen (November 5, 1931 – July 17, 2008) was a Slovene-American poet and essayist.

Life
Prosen was born to Slovene parents who emigrated to Newburgh, Ohio, a village that was annexed by the city of Cleveland, from Lower Carniola, present-day Slovenia. She worked as professor of English at the Cuyahoga Community College at Cuyahoga County, Ohio.

Works
As an essayist she published several articles, including the 1974 "Ethnic Literature" – Of Whom and for Whom. She also published four collections of poetry, the 1971 Poems, 1976 O The Ravages, and two collections in 1980, Apples and Thank You Michelangelo.

Awards
Her short memoir Looking Back: Newburgh won the first prize for the 1976 Growing Up Slavic in America competition.

References

1931 births
2008 deaths
Writers from Cleveland
American people of Slovenian descent
American women poets
20th-century American poets
20th-century American women writers
21st-century American women